The McGuire-Cummings Manufacturing Company was a streetcar and street-railway equipment builder based in the U.S. state of Illinois.  It was originally based in Chicago, but had a subsidiary factory in Paris, Illinois, and in its last years it was based in the latter city. It was founded in 1888 as the McGuire Manufacturing Company, later becoming McGuire-Cummings, and finally the Cummings Car and Coach Company. Snowplow cars and snow sweepersstreet railway cars designed specifically for snow removalwere among its most popular and best-known products.  The company built its last streetcars in 1930, but remained in business until 1943.  McGuire-Cummings was one of a few suppliers for the Toronto Civic Railways (1st four cars were ordered from McGuire-Cummings and retained by TCR successor Toronto Transportation Commission in 1921).

History

Overview
In The Time of the Trolley, historian William D. Middleton wrote that the company "was initially active as a builder of [street]car trucks, later produced [street railway] snowplows and sweepers, and finally manufactured a general line of steam and electric railway equipment."

Although North America was its principal market, the company also sold its products in foreign markets. Its snow sweeper, in particular, "was a popular item on dozens of European tramway systems," Middleton wrote.

In 1904, McGuire Manufacturing was renamed the McGuire-Cummings Manufacturing Company, with Walter J. Cummings as president.  In 1925, it became the Cummings Car & Coach Company, and was based in Paris, Illinois.  The company's streetcar production ended in 1930.

Notable production and sales

The McGuire Manufacturing Co. delivered in 1899 to the General Electric Co., of Schenectady, New York, one of the most compact electric locomotives that it had turned out until then. It was fitted with Westinghouse automatic air brakes, Trojan couplers, chime whistles, General Electric air compressors, and two G.E. 51 electric motors of  each, giving the machine a capacity of 

The McGuire company was contracted in 1899 to build 60 trucks for San Francisco, 120 for Havana, Cuba, 30 pairs for the Australian Government, and finishing the order for 300 for the Northwestern Elevated Railroad of Chicago, with smaller orders from every part of the United States. It was closing up the largest snowplow business the company has ever done in one year, with two orders, 10 for Washington, D.C., and 15 for St. Louis, besides a large number of single orders, among them being one for Spokane, Washington, and one for Burlington, Vermont. 

Plans were being prepared in 1899 for an additional building to be added to the McGuire plant that winter. This building was planned to be five stories high and devoted entirely to sweeper, electric locomotive, and sprinkler woodwork. The McGuire company was planning to introduce a new sprinkler in 1900, which was planned to be distinctive in design and construction. It was to be equipped with sweeper as well as a sprinkler.

Products
 Double-ended, double-truck streetcars
 Snow sweepers, snowplow cars
 Steeplecab electric locomotives

References

External links
Preserved railway equipment constructed by McGuire-Cummings

Manufacturing companies based in Chicago
Manufacturing companies established in 1888
Manufacturing companies disestablished in 1943
Defunct rolling stock manufacturers of the United States
1888 establishments in Illinois
1943 disestablishments in Illinois
Electric vehicle manufacturers of the United States
Defunct manufacturing companies based in Chicago